Halbinsel Au may refer to:

 Au peninsula, in Lake Zurich, Switzerland
 Halbinsel Au (ship, 1939), a former passenger ship on Lake Zurich, Switzerland